Alatiliparis is a genus of orchids native to Java and Sumatra in Indonesia. It contains 5 currently recognized species (as of May 2014):
Alatiliparis angustiflora (J.J.Sm.) Szlach. & Marg. - Sumatra and West Java
Alatiliparis filicornes Marg. & Szlach. - Sumatra
Alatiliparis lepanthes (Schltr.) Szlach. & Marg. - western Sumatra
Alatiliparis otochilus Marg. & Szlach. - Sumatra
Alatiliparis speculifera (J.J.Sm.) Szlach. & Marg.- western Java

References 

Malaxidinae
Malaxideae genera
Orchids of Indonesia
Orchids of Java
Orchids of Sumatra
Epiphytic orchids